Martha Issová (also known as Martha Issa; born 22 March 1981) is a Czech film, television and stage actress.

Biography
Issová was born in Prague. She comes from a family with Syrian roots. She is daughter of actress Lenka Termerová and director Moris Issa. Her cousin is Klára Issová. She studied State Conservatory in Prague. She started performing at Prague's Divadlo na Fidlovačce and continued to do so at other Prague theatres. Since 2006 she performs at Prague's Dejvice Theatre.

She has two daughters with her partner David Ondříček.

Filmography
Buko (2022) .... Tereza
Zátopek (2021) .... Dana Zátopková
Resistance (2020) .... Flora
The Zookeeper's Wife (2017) .... Regina Kenigswein
The Seven Ravens (2015) .... Bohdanka
Operace Dunaj (2009) .... Petra
You Kiss Like a God (2009) .... Běla, Adam's Wife
O bílé paní .... Fanynka
"Private Traps" (2008) .... Hanka Mašková (episode Tři do páru ???)
Night Owls (2008) .... Ofka
"Trapasy" (2008) TV series .... Mrs. Klímová (episode Kočárek 2008)
Little Girl Blue (2007) .... Cecilie
Stop (2007) (TV) .... Jana
"Náves" (2006) TV series .... Moka Vaněčková (episodes Last Love and Comedians, 2006)
"Dobrá čtvrť" (2005) TV series .... Katka Erhartová
"Hop nebo trop" (2005) TV series .... Bohuna
Koumáci (2004)
Děvčátko (2002) .... Věra
Waterloo po česku (2002)
Tuláci (2002) (TV)
Otec neznámý (2001) (TV) .... Maruška Outlá
Nelásky (2001)
Začátek světa (2000) .... Marta
Debut (2000) .... Jitka
The Conception of My Younger Brother (2000)
Hanele (1999)
Otevřené srdce (1999) .... Lisa
"Když se slunci nedaří" (1995) TV series

Theatre

Divadlo Na Fidlovačce
Loupežník .... Mimi
Horoskop pro Rudolfa II .... Trudi
Podivná paní S .... Fairy May
Když tančila .... Belzer
Help .... Aranka
Růžové šampaňské .... Mary
Nahniličko .... Seňorita

Dejvice Theatre 
The Magic Flute (2005) .... Pamina
KFT/Sandwich Reality® (2005) .... Ann
Karamazovi (2006) .... Kateřina
Spříznění volbou (2006) .... Otýlie
The Black Hole (2007) .... Brenda
Oblomov (2008) .... Olga Sergeievna Iljinskaya
Idiot (2008) .... Aglaia
Debris (2009) .... Michelle

Another Stage Works 
Nahniličko .... Seňorita (Kalich Theatre)

References

External links
Martha Issová in ČSFD
Interview in iHNed.cz

Czech television actresses
Czech stage actresses
Czech film actresses
Czech people of Syrian descent
Living people
1981 births
Actresses from Prague
20th-century Czech actresses
21st-century Czech actresses
Prague Conservatory alumni
Czech Lion Awards winners